Deionte Thompson (born February 11, 1997) is an American football safety for the Jacksonville Jaguars of the National Football League (NFL). He played college football at Alabama.

Early years
Thompson attended West Orange-Stark High School in West Orange, Texas. During his high school career he had 15 interceptions. He committed to the University of Alabama to play college football.

College career
After redshirting his first year at Alabama in 2015, Thompson played in 14 games in 2016, recording nine tackles. As a sophomore in 2017, he played in 14 games with two starts and had 25 tackles and one interceptions. Thompson took over as a starter in 2018. In 14 games he had 78 tackles and 2 interceptions. After the 2018 season, Thompson decided to forgo his senior year to pursue a career in the NFL.

Professional career

Thompson was selected by the Arizona Cardinals in the fifth round (139th overall) of the 2019 NFL Draft. In his rookie season, Thompson appeared in 11 games and recorded 18 tackles.

Thompson was placed on the reserve/COVID-19 list by the team on November 24, 2020, and activated on December 3.

On September 27, 2022, Thompson was waived by the Cardinals.

Jacksonville Jaguars
On October 19, 2022, Thompson was signed to the Jacksonville Jaguars practice squad. He signed a reserve/future contract on February 13, 2023.

References

External links
Alabama Crimson Tide bio

1997 births
Living people
People from Orange, Texas
Players of American football from Texas
American football safeties
Alabama Crimson Tide football players
All-American college football players
Arizona Cardinals players
Jacksonville Jaguars players